This list contains a variety of notable examples of low fantasy fiction. Low fantasy is a subgenre of fantasy defined by being set in the primary world as opposed to a secondary world like high fantasy. They are organized by alphabetical order by the author's last name. A separate section is included for non-print media.

Works

B 
 Tuck Everlasting by Natalie Babbitt
 The Indian in the Cupboard by Lynne Reid Banks
 The Dresden Files by Jim Butcher

C 
 Mortal Instruments series by Cassandra Claire
 The Dark Is Rising by Susan Cooper

D 
 The Bewitching Season by Melissa Doyle

G 
 Good Omens by Neil Gaiman and Terry Pratchett
 The Doll's House by Rumer Godden
 Tall Story by Candy Gourlay

L 
 That Hideous Strength by C. S. Lewis

N 
 Five Children and It by E. Nesbit
 The Snow Spider by Jenny Nimmo
 The Borrowers by Mary Norton

P
 “Harry Potter” by JK Rowling

Other media
Bewitched
I Dream of Jeannie

See also
List of high fantasy fiction

References

Lists of fantasy books
Fantasy-related lists